Agylla rotunda is a moth of the family Erebidae. It was described by George Hampson in 1900. It is found in Colombia and Bolivia.

References

Moths described in 1900
rotunda
Moths of South America